Soul Merchant is an album recorded by organist Sam Lazar and released on the Argo label.

Reception

Allmusic awarded the album 2 stars.

Track listing 
All compositions by Sam Lazar except as indicated
 "High Noon" (Dimitri Tiomkin, Ned Washington) - 4:18   
 "Happy Bossa Nova" - 4:16   
 "Sam's Jams" - 6:12   
 "C C Rider" (Traditional) - 5:07   
 "Smooth Coasting" - 3:45   
 "Soul Merchant" - 5:53

Personnel
Sam Lazar - organ
Miller Brisker - tenor saxophone
George Eskridge - guitar
Phil Thomas - drums

References

1962 albums
Sam Lazar albums
Argo Records albums
Albums produced by Esmond Edwards